Health law is a field of law that encompasses federal, state, and local law, rules, regulations and other jurisprudence among providers, payers and vendors to the health care industry and its patients, and delivery of health care services, with an emphasis on operations, regulatory and transactional issues.

Terminology
The Florida Bar defines "health law" as "legal issues involving federal, state, or local law, rules or regulations and health care provider issues, regulation of providers, legal issues regarding relationships between and among providers, legal issues regarding relationships between providers and payers, and legal issues regarding the delivery of health care services." American University's college of law, in health law and policy, divides health law into 4 areas: health care law (focused on treatment), public and population health law (focused on prevention), bioethics, and global health law.

The terms "legislation" and "law" are used to refer generically to statutes, regulation and other legal instruments (e.g. ministerial decrees) that may be the forms of law used in a particular country.

In general, there are a wide range of regulatory strategies that may be used to ensure people's health and safety. Increasingly, regulators are taking an approach of "responsive regulation". This involves using mechanisms that are responsive to the context, conduct, and culture of those being regulated, providing for a range of regulatory mechanisms to achieve the behavior desired. Where appropriate, the aim is to use incentives before sanctions. However, when those being regulated do not respond accordingly, escalating sanctions can be invoked. These strategies may be broadly classified into five groups:

 voluntarism: voluntary compliance undertaken by an individual organization without any coercion;
 self-regulation: for example, an unorganized group that regulates the behavior of its members through a voluntary code of practice;
 economic instruments: for example, supply funding sanctions or incentives for health care providers, and/or demand-side measures that give more power to consumers;
 meta-regulation: involving an external regulatory body to ensure that health care providers implement safety and quality practices and programs;
 command and control mechanisms: involving enforcement by government

Legal practice
Areas of law that may fall under the umbrella of health law include:
 Contract law
 Medical malpractice
 Medical law
 Administrative law
 Public health law
 Consent

In the U.S., medicine and the law are interconnected. The law intervenes to regulate the duty to treat, that essentially is ruled by contract law, which gives a doctor the right to refuse treatment, in the absence of an emergency, when no previous doctor-patient relationship existed. However Doctors cannot discriminate because of disability, ADA, abandon a patient, or not render services in an emergency according to EMTALA (it aims doctors in emergency rooms, where they need to screen, stabilize and transfer.
It also regulates the fiduciary duties of doctor-patient, such as privacy HIPAA, informed consent (battery unlawful touch), conflict of interests, (Moore case), etc.

Board certification
Health Law was first adopted as a separate legal specialty in which attorneys could become "board-certified" and in which they could hold themselves out as a "legal specialist" or "legal expert" by The Florida Bar's Board of Legal Specialization in 1995. Later Texas adopted a similar program in 2002 modeling its program after Florida's.

Education
One way in which an attorney in the United States can obtain additional education to practice health law or to use in becoming certified in the specialty of health law is through Master of Laws (LL.M.) programs offered by certain law schools. The LL.M. is considered to be a postgraduate law degree which shows a higher level of course work and study above the basic law degree (J.D. or B.S.L.). Some law schools with graduate law programs do offer a general LL.M. with course emphasis on health law, global health law, public health law, forensic medicine or similar studies.

Malpractice
Medical malpractice is also an area where law and medicine are interconnected, which relates to the standard of care, where custom similar locality rule may apply. There may be different schools of thought, where reputability is the issue at hand and alternative theories that can be based on the hand formula.

There are other aspects of importance within the area of medical malpractice, such as causation, where medical probability and loss of chance are present. Damages, where the value of life and tort reforms appear to differ, and affirmative defenses, within the doctrine of informed consent, where waivers cannot suffice. There are rules such as the discovery rule that states that the statute of limitations starts to run when the injury has been discovered and not when it took place.

See also
 Bioethics
 Health policy
 Health promotion
 Medical Law
 Drug policy
 Regulation of therapeutic goods
 World Association for Medical Law

References

Further reading
 European Journal of Health Law,  (electronic)  (Paper), Springer
 Journal of Health Politics, Policy and Law,  (electronic)  (paper), Duke University Press

External links